Ruetz is a surname. Notable people with the name include:

 Andi Ruetz (born 1975), Austrian luger
 Babe Ruetz (1893–1997), American football coach
 Helmut Ruetz (born 1972), Austrian luger
 Howie Ruetz (1927–1999), American football player
 Joe Ruetz (1916–2003), American football player
 Michael Ruetz (born 1940), German artist

See also
 Ruetz (river), a river in Austria and Tyrol